Doreen Massey may refer to:

 Doreen Massey, Baroness Massey of Darwen (born 1938), Labour member of the House of Lords
 Doreen Massey (geographer) (1944–2016), British social scientist and geographer